McMaster-Carr Supply Company is a private American supplier of hardware, tools, raw materials, industrial materials, and maintenance equipment. The company was founded in 1901 and is based in Elmhurst, Illinois, with distribution centers in Robbinsville, New Jersey; Santa Fe Springs, California; Douglasville, Georgia and Aurora, Ohio.

History
The company was founded in 1901 at 160 East Lake street in Chicago as the McMaster-Davis Supply Company. Started with $50,000 in investor capital, its founders were T.J. McMaster, a former stationary engineer, and F.C. Davis, who had been a chief engineer in the U.S. Navy. In 1904, an attorney with a background in mechanical engineering named Walter S. Carr purchased the company. As early as 1908, the name of the company had been changed from McMaster-Davis to McMaster-Carr.

Harry and James Channon, the sons of Henry Channon the founder of the H. Channon company, a large Chicago distributor of maritime and steam engine supplies later purchased the company.

Catalog
In 1908 the company printed and copyrighted its first catalog, at 506 pages in length. It releases its current catalog annually. The distinctive yellow print edition of the catalog is limited in distribution, sent primarily to established customers.

Website
McMaster-Carr's website ranked third among e-commerce sites in a 2002 study performed at Stanford University about trust and credibility, just behind Amazon and Barnes & Noble.  The site intersperses design tips and explanations of material properties within product offerings.

Mobile phone app
The McMaster app was released in May 2013 for the iPad and March 2014 for Android devices.

Awards
In 2015 McMaster-Carr was recognized by customers, in a survey by B2B business reviewer VendOp, as one of the top B2B vendors in the United States in multiple categories.

See also 

 MSC Industrial Direct
 Grainger
 MISUMI USA

References

External links
 

Industrial supply companies
Privately held companies based in Illinois
Business services companies established in 1901
1901 establishments in Illinois
Companies based in DuPage County, Illinois